Crosstown Concourse is a mixed use development in Memphis, Tennessee. It is located in the heart of the Crosstown neighborhood, so named for the intersecting trolley tracks at Cleveland and Poplar that connected Memphis commuters to the neighborhood in 1927. Crosstown Concourse itself is located at the intersection of North Parkway and N. Watkins Street and is the western terminus of the V&E Greenline. 

Crosstown Concourse stands 14 stories tall and includes 65,000 square feet of retail, 630,000 square feet of commercial office space, 265 apartments, and a high school. The property is also Platinum LEED certified - the largest historical adaptive reuse platinum LEED certified building in the world.

History 

Crosstown Concourse was once a Sears, Roebuck & Co. distribution center and retail store, which opened on August 27th, 1927, welcoming nearly 30,000 visitors on its first day. The original 640,000 sf structure was built in only 180 days. By 1965, five separate additions had expanded the Sears Crosstown facility to a final size of 1,500,000 sf. In addition to the 150,000 sf retail store, the building was the distribution center for all orders in the Mid-South, including Mississippi, Louisiana, Arkansas, and Alabama and handled 45,000 orders daily, selling everything from clothes and board games to go-carts and kit houses.

Revitalization 
Forty years after opening its doors, Sears Crosstown had grown to 1.5 million square feet on 19 acres. Sears closed the Crosstown retail store in 1983.

The site remained a regional distribution center for Sears. But less than 30 years later, due to the decline in the company's mail-order business, Sears closed many of its warehouses across the country, including Crosstown. Sears closed the Crosstown retail store in 1983 due to bankruptcy.

The building was left vacant in 1993 and remained an iconic yet vandalized and empty tower for more than 20 years.

In 2010, Todd Richardson, art history professor at the University of Memphis, and Christopher Miner, a video artist, formed Crosstown Arts, a nonprofit contemporary arts organization that would serve as the building's developer and is now also a building tenant.

Two years later, the two had commitments from eight local tenants willing to lease a total of 600,000 square feet, nearly half of the building. By the time Crosstown officials asked the Memphis City Council for $15 million (the project's final piece of funding) a year later, the building's tenants included Church Health, Methodist Healthcare, Gestalt Community Schools, St. Jude Children's Research Hospital, ALSAC, Memphis Teacher Residency, Rhodes College, and, of course, Crosstown Arts.

Today, Crosstown Concourse is a vertical urban village anchored in expanding culture, arts, education and healthcare. The building now includes Crosstown Arts, Crosstown High School, Parcels apartments, a small hotel, numerous health-care agencies and nonprofits, 15 restaurants, retail, and more. 

The revitalization of the building led to a foreseen improvement in the surrounding community.

See also
 National Register of Historic Places listings in Shelby County, Tennessee

References
https://www.memphisflyer.com/memphis/crosstown-concourse-the-vertical-village-comes-to-life/Content?oid=7676149

External links

Crosstown Concourse
Sears Crosstown Building on Emporis
Crosstown Arts

National Register of Historic Places in Memphis, Tennessee
Sears Holdings buildings and structures
Skyscraper office buildings in Memphis, Tennessee
Residential skyscrapers in Memphis, Tennessee